Hemignathus is a Hawaiian honeycreeper genus in the subfamily Carduelinae of the finch family, Fringillidae.

These birds are endemic to the Hawaiian Islands.

Extinctions
Many of its species became extinct during the 19th and 20th centuries due to a combination of habitat destruction, introduced predators, and most importantly mosquito-borne diseases.

One species, the giant nukupu'u (Hemignathus vorpalis), is known only from fossils, and became extinct in prehistoric times when Polynesian settlers deforested the lowlands for agriculture.

Taxonomy
(Sub)Genus Hemignathus sensu stricto - pointed or long and downcurved bills, insectivores or nectarivores.  The Nukupu‘u:
 Giant nukupu‘u, Hemignathus vorpalis - prehistoric
 Maui nukupuʻu Hemignathus affinis - probably extinct (late 1990s?)
 Oʻahu nukupuʻu Hemignathus lucidus - extinct (1837)
 Kauaʻi nukupuʻu Hemignathus hanapepe - probably extinct (late 1900s?)

(Sub)Genus Heterorhynchus - long and downcurved upper and short and stout lower bill, probes for insects 
 ʻAkiapolaʻau, Heterorhynchus wilsoni

See also
 
 

 
Hawaiian honeycreepers
Endemic fauna of Hawaii
Bird genera
Carduelinae
Higher-level bird taxa restricted to the Australasia-Pacific region
Taxonomy articles created by Polbot